Eodorcadion argaloides is a species of beetle in the family Cerambycidae. It was described by Stephan von Breuning in 1947. It is known from Mongolia.

References

Dorcadiini
Beetles described in 1947